Jane Naana Opoku-Agyemang   (née Sam; born 22 November 1951) is a Ghanaian academic and politician who served as Minister for Education from February 2013 to January 2017. She is a full professor of literature. She served as the first female Vice-Chancellor of a state university in Ghana when she took over as Vice-Chancellor of University of Cape Coast. She currently serves as the Chancellor of the Women's University in Africa.

In the round up to the 2020 General Elections, there were media speculations that the leadership of the biggest opposition party, National Democratic Congress (NDC) will announce her as the new presidential running mate. H.E. John Dramani Mahama made the official declaration on July 6, 2020.

Early life and education 
Born on 22 November 1951 in Cape Coast, Ghana, Jane Naana Opoku-Agyemang (née Jane Naana Sam) attended Anglican Girls' Secondary School at Koforidua and Aburi Presby Girls' School. She then had her secondary education at the Wesley Girls High School in Cape Coast from 1964 to 1971. She completed B.Ed.(Hons) in English and French at the University of Cape Coast in 1977. She also has a Diploma in Advanced Studies in French from the University of Dakar and obtained her master's degree and Doctorate degrees from York University in Toronto, Ontario, Canada in 1980 and 1986 respectively.

Career

Academic career 
Professor Opoku-Agyemang taught and worked at the University of Cape Coast, starting in 1986. She has held various academic positions including: Head of the Department of English, Dean of the Faculty of Arts, Warden of Adehye Hall, Valco Trust Fund Post-Graduate Hostel, and the Founding Dean of School of Graduate Studies and Research. From 1997, she has held the position of Academic Director of the School for International Training in the History and Cultures of the African Diaspora. From 2008 to 2012 she was the university's Vice Chancellor. She assumed duty on 1 October 2008, succeeding Emmanuel Addow-Obeng.

In March, 2007, she was one of five scholars selected to deliver presentations during the 200th Anniversary of the Abolition of Slavery at the United Nations Headquarters in New York City.

In October 2009, she was elected Ghana's representative to the executive board of the United Nations Educational, Scientific and Cultural Organisation (UNESCO).

Ahead of the 2012 general elections, Jane Opoku Agyemang moderated the debate with Kojo Oppong Nkrumah.

On 26 October 2018, she became the Chancellor of the Women's University in Africa located in Zimbabwe.

She has served on many local and international boards and committees such as the Centre for Democratic Governance, (CDD-Ghana), the editorial board of the Harriet Tubman Series on the African Diaspora (Africa World Press Inc. USA), the Africa Initiative in Canada, and the College of Physicians and Surgeons as an Eminent Citizen.

Author 
Opoku-Agyemang is an author. Her focus areas includes Literature with a focus on Women from Ghana, Oral literature in Ghana and Africa, Communication Skills and Issues in the African Diaspora. As an academic she has written and published in scholarly journals and presented articles at various conferences including at the 200th Anniversary of the Abolition of Slavery at the United Nations Headquarters in New York City and at the Inaugural Lecture to the Ghana Academy of Arts and Sciences. In 2015, whilst the Education Minister she published and launched a five volumes collection of published folktales titled ‘Who told the most incredible story?"’

Politics

Minister for Education 
Between February 2013 and January 2017 she served as the Minister of Education after she was appointed by President John Mahama to serve in that role after the National Democratic Congress had won the 2012 Ghanaian general election. One of her focus areas was empowering the girl child education and empowering women. During her period of serving as minister for education she also focused on implementing policies that covered inclusiveness in education in Ghana which birth the Inclusive Education Policy 2015.

Vice presidential campaign 
Opoku-Agyemang was selected as the presidential running mate for the National Democratic Congress (NDC) on July 6, 2020 for Ghana’s December 2020 General elections. She became the first female running mate of the two major political parties in Ghana. Her selection by the flagbearer, John Dramani Mahama of the National Democratic Congress was applauded by women groups and women activists as a positive sign to the Ghanaian political scene to promote gender balance and equality. She however received harsh criticisms and sometimes insults from some key members of the ruling NPP, particularly the Ashanti Regional Chairman of the NPP, Bernard Antwi Boasiako aka Chairman Wontumi, who called her "ugly" and "witch" during a live radio show on Kumasi-based, Wontumi FM, which he owns. She appealed to Ghanaians to vote for change and promised to use her office as vice president to influence sustainable development and practical youth-centred policies. Her campaign message was devoid of attacks on opponents. Her intensive campaign in the coastal communities and her home region, the Central Region yielded results as the NDC won most of the constituencies they had lost in 2016. The NDC also won 9 out of the 16 regions in Ghana including the major battleground, Greater Accra.

Prof. Opoku-Agyemang continues to remain one of the most influential voices in Ghanaian politics. She has criticized the implementation of the government's Free SHS policy which was a major campaign item for the ruling party.

Professional association 
Opoku-Agyemang is a Fellow of the Ghana Academy of Arts and Sciences, University Teachers Association of Ghana, English Studies Association, African Studies Association, United States, African Literature Association, United States and International Fulbright Scholars Association, Commonwealth of Learning amongst others.

Personal life 
Opoku Agyemang is a Christian who worships as a Methodist. She has three children; Dr. Kweku Opoku-Agyemang, Dr. Kwabena Opoku-Agyemang and Dr. Maame Adwoa Opoku-Agyemang.

Awards and recognition

Opoku-Agyemang has been honoured with honorary degrees from the University of West Indies and Winston-Salem University. She has also received an award for Global leadership from the University of South Florida in Tampa. She has also received the Officer of the Order of the Volta award for Academic Distinction in 2011 by President John Atta Mills.  and Ghana Women of Excellence Award in the Education category due her contribution to the development and promotion of quality education in Ghana. She has been acknowledged for Outstanding Performance in Advancing International Education, School for International Training, Vermont, USA on two occasions.

In 2020 she was named among the 40 Most Inspirational Female Leaders in Ghana for serving as a role model for women in Ghana and in Africa Avance media also named her among the 100 Most Influential Women in Africa. In January 2023, Opoku Agyemang was listed among the 100 most reputable Africans.

Bibliography
"Where there is No Silence: Articulations of Resistance to Enslavement". Revised Inaugural Lecture to the Ghana Academy of Arts and Sciences.
Opoku-Agyemang, N. J., Lovejoy, P. E., Trotman, D. V. (eds), Africa and its Diasporas: History, Memory and Literary Manifestations, Trenton, New Jersey, USA: Africa World Press, 2008.
Where There is No Silence: Articulations of Resistance to Enslavement, Accra: Page Link Publishers, 2008.
Anquandah, J., Opoku-Agyemang, N.J., and Doormont, M. (eds), The Trans-Atlantic Slave Trade: Landmarks, Legacies, Expectations, Accra: Sub-Saharan Publishers, 2007, pp. 210–224.
"The Living Experience of the Slave Trade in Sankana and Gwollu: Literary Manifestations and Implications for Tourism". In James Anquandah, Naana Opoku-Agyemang and Michel Doormont (eds), The Trans-Atlantic Slave Trade: Landmarks, Legacies, Expectations, Accra: Sub-Saharan Publishers, 2007, pp.
"A Fork in the Road: Ayi Kwei Armah's Osiris Rising and Florence Ladd's Sarah's Psalm on the subject of homecoming" in Naana J. Opoku-Agyemang, with Paul E. Lovejoy and David V. Trotman (eds), Africa and its Diasporas: History, Memory and Literary Manifestations, Trenton, New Jersey, USA: Africa World Press, 2008, pp. 303–318.

References

External links
 University of Cape Coast Vice-Chancellor's Profile
 AllAfrica.com
 African Press Agency
 Myjoyonline.com

|-

1951 births
Living people
University of Cape Coast alumni
York University alumni
Academic staff of the University of Cape Coast
Vice-Chancellors of universities in Ghana
Education ministers of Ghana
National Democratic Congress (Ghana) politicians
Women academic administrators
People from Cape Coast
Ghanaian women academics
Women government ministers of Ghana
Vice-Chancellors of the University of Cape Coast
21st-century Ghanaian women politicians
People educated at Wesley Girls' Senior High School
Fellows of the Ghana Academy of Arts and Sciences
Recipients of the Order of the Volta